Islamic terrorism in Europe has been carried out by the Islamic State (ISIL) or Al-Qaeda as well as Islamist lone wolves since the late 20th century. Europol, which releases the annual EU Terrorism Situation and Trend report (TE-SAT), used the term "Islamist terrorism" in the years 2006–2010, "religiously inspired terrorism" 2011–2014, and has used "jihadist terrorism" since 2015. Europol defines jihadism as "a violent ideology exploiting traditional Islamic concepts".

In the early 2000s, most of the Islamic terrorist activity was linked to Al-Qaeda and the plots tended to involve groups carrying out co-ordinated bombings. The deadliest attacks of this period were the 2004 Madrid train bombings, which killed 193 civilians (the deadliest Islamist attack in Europe), and the 7 July 2005 London bombings, which killed 52.

There was a rise in Islamic terrorist incidents in Europe after 2014. The years 2014–16 saw more people killed by Islamic terrorist attacks in Europe than all previous years combined, and the highest rate of attack plots per year. Most of this terrorist activity was inspired by ISIL, and many European states have had some involvement in the military intervention against it. A number of plots involved people who entered or re-entered Europe as asylum seekers during the European migrant crisis, and some attackers had returned to Europe after fighting in the Syrian Civil War. The Jewish Museum of Belgium shooting in May 2014 was the first attack in Europe by a returnee from the Syrian war.

While most earlier Islamic terrorist attacks in Europe were carried out by groups and involved bombs, most attacks since 2014 have been carried out by individuals using guns, knives and vehicles. A notable exception is the Brussels cell, which carried out two of the deadliest attacks of the period.

The deadliest attacks of this period have been the November 2015 Paris attacks (130 killed), the July 2016 Nice truck attack (86 killed), the June 2016 Atatürk Airport attack (45 killed), the March 2016 Brussels bombings (32 killed), and the May 2017 Manchester Arena bombing (22 killed). These attacks and threats have led to major security operations and plans such as Opération Sentinelle in France, Operation Vigilant Guardian and the Brussels lockdown in Belgium, and Operation Temperer in the United Kingdom.

Definition

The 2020 TE-SAT by Europol describes jihadism as "a violent ideology exploiting traditional Islamic concepts". Jihadists do this by exploiting the concept of jihad, which means 'striving' or 'exertion' but can also refer to religiously sanctioned warfare and aim to create an Islamic state governed exclusively by their interpretation of Islamic law. The report describes jihadism as a violent subcurrent of Salafism, while noting that other subcurrents of Salafism are quietist. The two major representatives of jihadism are al-Qaeda and ISIL.

Overview

The first incidents of Islamic terrorism occurred in France in 1995 when a network with ties to Algeria carried out a string of bombings in Paris in retaliation for French involvement in the Algerian Civil War.

In the early 2000s, most of the Islamic terrorist activity was linked to Al-Qaeda and the plots tended to involve groups carrying out co-ordinated bombings. The deadliest attacks of this period were the 2004 Madrid train bombings, which killed 193 civilians (the deadliest Islamist attack in Europe), and the 7 July 2005 London bombings, which killed 52.

Although militants in Syria had started to organize attacks in Europe by sending terrorist operatives to carry out attacks as early as 2012, security services in the European countries they sought to attack did not see the arrested individuals as part of a network with a cohesive strategy. Instead the general consensus saw them as radicalized individuals. Many of these operatives were arrested, while others carried out unsophisticated attacks which caused little damage but still served to overload security services.

Since 2014, more than 20 fatal attacks have been carried out in Europe. France saw eight attacks between January 2015 and July 2016; this included the January 2015 Île-de-France attacks, the November 2015 Paris attacks, and the July 2016 Nice truck attack. The United Kingdom saw three major attacks carried out in a span of four months in early 2017 (Westminster attack, Manchester Arena bombing, and London Bridge attack). Other targets in Europe have included Belgium, Germany, Russia, and Spain. The transcontinental city of Istanbul also saw both bombings and shootings, including in January 2016, June 2016 and January 2017.

In 2015, the Islamic State, which in 2014 had claimed that all Muslims were under a religious obligation to join it, declared that the only excuse for Muslims to not join the group in territories under its control was to perpetrate terrorist attacks in their current place of residence. According to Europol's annual report released in 2017, the Islamic State exploited the flow of refugees and migrants to commit acts of terrorism, which was a feature of the 2015 Paris attacks. In 2016 attack planning against Western countries took place in Syria and Iraq. Groups such as al-Qaeda and ISIL had the intent and capabilities to mount mass casualty attacks with volunteers.

The Counter Extremism Project states police investigations have found links between internet radicalization and terrorist attacks. In 2019, Julian King, the European Commissioner for the Security Union, stated that terrorist content on the internet "had a role to play in every single attack on European soil in the last few years". However, Swedish news agency Tidningarnas Telegrambyrå reviewed attacks in Western Europe between 2014 and 2017 and stated that most attackers radicalize as a result of personal contact rather than online.

In 2017, the EU Counter-terrorism Coordinator Gilles de Kerchove stated in an interview that there were more than 50,000 radicals and jihadists in Europe. In 2016, French authorities stated that 15,000 of the 20,000 individuals on the list of security threats belong to Islamist movements. After the Manchester Arena bombing in May 2017, British authorities and MI5 estimated they had 500 ongoing investigations into 3,000 jihadist extremists as potential terrorist attackers, with a further 20,000 having been "subjects of interest" in the past, including the Manchester and Westminster attackers.

According to Lorenzo G. Vidino, jihadi terrorists in Europe mobilized by ISIL have tended to be second-generation immigrant Muslims. Consequently, countries such as Italy and Spain with a smaller demographic in this category have experienced fewer attacks than countries in Central and Northern Europe such as France, the United Kingdom, Germany and Belgium.

British think tank ICSR argues for a connection between terrorism and crime: up to 40% of terrorist plots in Europe are part-financed through petty crime such as drug-dealing, theft, robberies, loan fraud and burglaries, and most jihadists have been imprisoned for petty or violent crime prior to radicalisation (some of whom radicalise while in prison). Jihadists use ordinary crime as a way to finance their activity and have also argued this to be the "ideologically correct" way to wage 'jihad 'in 'lands of war'.

According to German anthropologist Susanne Schröter, attacks in European countries in 2017 showed that the military defeat of the Islamic State did not mean the end of Islamist violence. Schröter also compared the events in Europe to a jihadist strategy formulated in 2005 by Abu Musab al-Suri, where an intensification of terror would destabilise societies and encourage Muslim youth to revolt. The expected civil war never materialised in Europe, but did occur in other regions such as Libya, Syria, Iraq and the Philippines (Battle of Marawi).

List of attacks

1994–1995

2000–2013

2014

2015
According to Europol, terrorist attacks attributed to jihadists in the European Union increased from four in 2014 to seventeen in 2015, while the number of people killed increased from four to 150. Non-EU areas of Europe are not included in the Europol figures.

In 2015, the terrorist threat level was zero in Poland, on its scale which has four levels plus the "zero level". About 20-40 Polish nationals had travelled to the conflict zone in Syria-Iraq.

2016
In 2016, a total of 135 people were killed in ten completed jihadist attacks in the European Union, according to Europol figures, while 62 others were killed in Turkey and one in Russia. Thirteen attacks were attempted. The number of arrests increased on the previous year, to 718. In France, the number of arrests increased from 377 in 2015 to 429 in 2016. One in four (26%) of those arrested in 2016 were women, an increase from 18% the previous year. The threat in 2016 consisted of remotely directed individuals operating alone or in small groups. In addition to these, there were those that were inspired by propaganda but not instructed or directed.

2017
In 2017, a total of 62 people were killed in ten completed jihadist attacks in the European Union, according to Europol figures. The number of attempted jihadist attacks reached 33 in 2017, double that of the previous year. Most of the deaths were in the UK (35), Spain (16), Sweden (5) and France (3). In addition to those killed, a total of 819 people were injured in 14 attacks. The pattern of jihadist attacks in 2017 led Europol to conclude that terrorists preferred to attack ordinary people rather than causing property damage or loss of capital.

According to Europol's annual report on terrorism in the European Union, the jihadist attacks in 2017 had three patterns: indiscriminate killings (London attacks in March and June and Barcelona attacks), attacks on Western lifestyle (the Manchester bombing in May 2017, 2017 Istanbul nightclub shooting), and attacks on symbols of authority (Paris attacks in February, June and August). The agency's report also noted that jihadist attacks had caused more deaths and casualties than any other type of terrorist attack, that such attacks had become more frequent, and that there had been a decrease in the sophistication and preparation of the attacks.

In 2017, a total of 705 individuals were arrested in 18 EU Member states, 373 of those in France. Most arrests were on suspicion of membership in a terrorist organisation (354), suspicion of planning (120), or of preparing (112) a terrorist attack.

2018 
In 2018, a total of 13 people were killed and 46 were injured in seven completed jihadist attacks in the European Union, according to Europol figures. The number of attempted jihadist attacks was 24, down from 33 the previous year. All attacks were carried out by perpetrators acting alone. Europol noted in its 2019 report that generally, individuals who act alone seldom do so in total isolation as attackers often maintain relations in small or loosely defined networks and may receive moral or material support from individuals sharing their ideas. A number of the stopped attacks involved groups of perpetrators. The year saw equal numbers of EU citizens and non-EU citizens carrying out attacks. All attackers were male and their average age was 26.

2019 
In 2019, a total of ten people were killed in three completed jihadist attacks in the European Union, according to Europol figures. An additional four attacks failed and 14 were foiled. All completed and failed attacks except for one were carried out by perpetrators acting alone, whereas most of the foiled plots involved more than one person.

2020 
In 2020, a total of twelve people were killed in ten completed jihadist attacks in the European Union, with an additional three people killed in three additional completed jihadist attacks in the United Kingdom, according to Europol figures. All attackers were men between the ages of 18 and 33, and all were lone actors. Of the attackers, five had come to the EU as asylum seekers or illegal immigrants. At least five of the attacks involved assailants who were either convicts or had been released from prison sentences. In addition to the completed attacks there were two attempted attacks that were thwarted and Switzerland recorded two attacks involving probable jihadist motivation.

2021 
In 2021, two people were killed in three completed jihadist attacks in the European Union, according to Europol figures. An additional eight attacks were foiled.

Terrorist plots 

This is a list of plots which have been classified as terrorism by a law enforcement agency and/or for which at least one person has been convicted of planning one or more terrorist crimes with Islamist motives.

Responses to terrorism 

According to Europol, the number of people arrested on suspicion of jihadist-related terrorist offences in the European Union increased from 395 in 2014 to 687 in 2015.

In 2015, most arrests were made in France (377), followed by Spain (75) and Belgium (60); statistics for the United Kingdom were not available. During 2015, jihadist terrorism related verdicts were 198 out of a total of 527 terrorism related verdicts.  The average sentence for jihadist terrorism increased from 4 years in 2014 to 6 years. In Austria, Belgium, Denmark and Sweden, all terrorism verdicts concerned jihadist terrorism.

In 2016, a total of 718 people were arrested on suspicion of jihadist-related terrorist offences in the European Union. During 2016, 358 verdicts on jihadi terrorism were delivered by courts in the EU, the vast majority of all terrorism verdicts. Belgium had the highest number of such verdicts at 138. All terrorism verdicts in Austria, Belgium, Estonia, Finland, France, Italy, Portugal and Sweden related to jihadist terrorism. Of those convicted for jihadist terrorist offences, 22 were women, such offences were punished with an average sentence of 5 years in prison.

After the vehicle-ramming attack, European countries began equipping pedestrian areas with barriers.

In 2017, the total number of arrests was 705. During 2017, 352 verdicts on jihadi terrorism were delivered by courts in the EU, this was the vast majority of all terrorist convictions (569). The average sentence remained at 5 years in prison. The country with the highest number of jihadist convictions was France with 114.

In 2017, according to Gilles de Kerchove, the European Union's Counter-terrorism Coordinator, the United Kingdom had the highest number of known Islamist radicals of any European country at around 20 to 25 thousand. de Kerchove said that three thousand of those were considered a direct threat by MI5 and 500 were under constant surveillance.

A number of European countries—Austria, Belgium, Denmark, France, the Netherlands, and the United Kingdom—made legal changes which enable deprivation of citizenship of individuals engaged in terrorism if they have dual citizenship.

See also

 Terrorism
 Islam and violence
 List of terrorist incidents linked to ISIL
 Stabbing as a terrorist tactic
 Vehicle-ramming attack

Notes

References

 
2010s in Europe
Islamic terrorist incidents in the 2010s
Spillover of the Syrian civil war
Terrorism in 2014
Terrorism in 2015
Terrorism in 2016
Terrorism in 2017
Terrorism in 2018
Terrorism in 2019
Terrorism in 2020